Dan Macaulay is a Contemporary Christian music recording artist and contemporary worship leader from Brantford, Ontario, Canada. He now resides in Williamsville, New York. Some of his most well-known songs are: "Amazing", "Hope Is Here (Joy To The World)", "From You For You", "Win With Love", "Live Like You're Free", "Listening (Light Of The World", and "Permanent".

Musical career 
Macaulay released his debut album Captured Again as an independent artist in 2004. The album won two 2007 Shai Awards (formerly Vibe Awards), Worship Album of the Year and Male Soloist of the Year.

The song "Open Sky" from Captured Again was selected to be on the Canadian Christian Worship compilation Sea to Sea: I See the Cross which won a GMA Canada Covenant Award in 2006 for Special Events/Compilation Album of the Year.

He released a 4-track EP in 2009 called The Listening EP produced by Nathan Nockels (formerly of Watermark).  The EP received two 2009 GMA Canada Covenant Award nominations (Canada's equivalent to the U.S. GMA Dove Award), Pop Contemporary Song of the Year for "Listening", and Worship Song of the Year for "Amazing". These songs were then included on the full-length album called "From You For You" released in April 2012.

Macaulay's song "Win With Love" from The Listening EP was chosen by Worship Leader magazine's Song Discovery program and was featured in their March and April 2009 issue.

Also, "Live Like You're Free" from the full-length album "From You For You" was chosen by Worship Leader magazine's Song Discovery program to be featured in their May 2012 issue.

Macaulay was a finalist in the 2011 session II John Lennon Songwriting Contest in the Gospel song category for his song "In Awe" found on the album '"From You For You"'

Macaulay worked with Michael W. Smith on a cover of Michaels song "Breathe in Me" from Michael's 1995 album I'll Lead You Home. Michael played keyboard on the recording and produced the track along with Bryan Lenox. This recording was included on Macaulay's April 3, 2012 full-length worship release "From You For You".

Macaulay received four 2012 Canadian Gospel Music Award Nominations (Canada's equivalent to the U.S. GMA Dove Award), including: "2012 Praise & Worship Album of The Year" (From You For You); "2012 Praise & Worship Song of The Year" (In Awe); "2012 Modern Worship Song of The Year" (From You For You); "2012 Seasonal Song of The Year" (Hope Is Here).

Original Christmas song "Hope Is Here (Joy to the World)", released by Macaulay in November 2011 was listed by Praise Charts.com at No. 9 on their list of the "Top 100 Christmas Worship Songs"

Discography

Albums 
From You For You Worship Leader Magazine March 2012 Review )
 Released April 2012
 Tracks:
From You For You
Be Our Love
Your Kindness
In Awe
Permanent
Listening
Breathe In Me
Win With Love
Amazing
Saving Grace (Come Thou Fount)
Live Like You're Free

Hope Is Here (Joy To The World) – Single
 Released November 2011
 Tracks:
Hope Is Here (Joy To The World)
In Awe (new album preview)

The Listening EP (reviews)
 Released 2009
 Tracks: "Win With Love", "Listening", "Amazing", "Listening Radio Edit"

Captured Again (review)
 Released 2004
 Tracks:
You Make Me
Open Sky
Amazing
Presence Interlude
In The Presence
Your Love
Wonderful Maker / So Much
In Me Interlude
Today
Captured Again
Holy
Amazing Interlude
Our Offering

References

External links
 Dan Macaulay's official homepage
 Harvest Time Church International

1975 births
Living people
Musicians from Brantford
Canadian singer-songwriters
Canadian performers of Christian music
People from Williamsville, New York
21st-century Canadian male singers
Canadian male singer-songwriters